The Metropolitan Conference was an intercollegiate athletic conference that existed from 1923 to 1931. It has been one of ten athletics conferences with this name although the only one to sponsor a football championship. The league had members in the state of New York.

Champions

1923 – St. John's (NY)
1924 – Unknown
1925 – Unknown

1926 – Unknown
1927 – Unknown
1928 – Unknown

1929 – St. John's (NY)
1930 – St. John's (NY)
1931 – Unknown

See also
Metropolitan New York Conference
List of defunct college football conferences

References

Defunct college sports conferences in the United States
College sports in New York (state)